The Pondles is a British animated television series which consists of 13 episodes which was originally broadcast in 1987.

Synopsis 
The Pondles are tiny green creatures with small caps made of acorns, who live in a small village called Puddletown located in a backyard behind a thick hedge. The series focuses on the different adventures they experience in every episode.

Episodes 
01. The Puddletown Parade
02. The Rain Dance
03. The Three Little Jackdaws
04. The Purple Thingamabob
05. The Puddletown Puffer
06. Mustard's Mystery Machine
07. The Tortoise and the Puffer
08. Pip's Birthday
09. The Pondleberry Robbers
10. Grandad's Shed
11. The Boat Race
12. The Concertina
13. Daisy Saves the Day

External links
 

1980s British animated television series
1980s British children's television series
1987 British television series debuts
1987 British television series endings
ITV children's television shows
Television series by ITV Studios
Television shows produced by Central Independent Television
English-language television shows